The Bell Witch is a short, promotional EP released by Danish heavy metal band Mercyful Fate to herald their reunion album.  It features two tracks off In the Shadows, of which one is based on the American legend of the Bell Witch, plus four live tracks. The EP was released in 1994. It was re-released in 2004 on Metal Blade Records.

Track listing 
"The Bell Witch" (Hank Shermann) (King Diamond) – 4:34
"Is that You, Melissa" (King Diamond) – 4:37
"Curse of the Pharaohs" (Diamond, Shermann) – 4:24 |¹
"Egypt" (Diamond) – 4:53 |¹
"Come to the Sabbath" (Diamond) – 6:48 |¹
"Black Funeral" (Diamond, Shermann) – 3:40 |¹

|¹ Recorded live 8 October 1993 in Los Angeles, California.

Credits 
King Diamond – vocals
Hank Shermann – guitars
Michael Denner – guitars
Timi "Grabber" Hansen – bass
Snowy Shaw – drums (on live tracks only, studio tracks feature Morten Nielsen)
Sharlee D'Angelo – bass (on live tracks)

References 

Bell Witch, The
1994 EPs
Metal Blade Records EPs